Firecrackers. A Realistic Novel is a 1925 novel by American author Carl Van Vechten. It is one of several fictional works published that same year which assayed the temerity and hedonism of the Jazz Age including F. Scott Fitzgerald's The Great Gatsby and Anita Loos' Gentlemen Prefer Blondes.

Van Vechten dedicated this novel to his friend James Branch Cabell. The book is considered to be the fourth entry in a series about New York's "Upper Bohemians." Firecrackers chronicles the further adventures of characters—such as Paul Moody, Gareth Johns, Ella Nattatorrini, and Edith Dale—who appeared in Vechten's earlier works, The Blind Bow-Boy (1923) and The Tattooed Countess (1924).

Synopsis 

During 1924, a blasé coterie of pleasure-seeking sophisticates are inordinately excited by a handsome and athletic newcomer to their social circle, Gunnar O'Grady, "a youth with the appearance of a Greek Adonis." Alternately seeking and avoiding their attentions, this enigmatic individual drifts through a series of menial vocations including furnace repairman, florist, waiter, and acrobat.

O'Grady becomes an object of sexual fascination to many within the circle, including a precocious young girl, a thrill-seeking wife, and a bored husband. Tensions escalate as various persons within the coterie vie for O'Grady's companionship, and O'Grady finds his own desires stymied.

Reception 
Writer F. Scott Fitzgerald praised the novel in his personal correspondence to Van Vechten. In a letter dated July 27, 1925, Fitzgerald wrote: "I like [Firecrackers] best of your four novels—It seems to me that this rather than The Tattooed Countless is your true line of genius. In [the character of] Campaspe, for example, you suggest so much more than you say—she is the embodiment of New York, mysterious and delicate and entirely original."

References

Bibliography

External links
 

Fiction set in 1924
1925 American novels
Jazz culture
Alfred A. Knopf books
Novels set in the Roaring Twenties
Novels set in New York City